Grod Island is the southernmost island in the Onogur group off the northwest coast of Robert Island in the South Shetland Islands, Antarctica.  The feature is low and ice-free, extending 610 m in east-west direction and 200 m wide.  It is separated from Robert Island by a 130 m wide passage.

The island is named after the Bulgar ruler Grod (6th century).

Location
Grod Island is located 810 m north of Misnomer Point and 940 m southwest of Shipot Point. British mapping in 1968 and Bulgarian mapping in 2009.

Maps
 Livingston Island to King George Island.  Scale 1:200000.  Admiralty Nautical Chart 1776.  Taunton: UK Hydrographic Office, 1968.
 L.L. Ivanov. Antarctica: Livingston Island and Greenwich, Robert, Snow and Smith Islands. Scale 1:120000 topographic map. Troyan: Manfred Wörner Foundation, 2009.  (Second edition 2010)
Antarctic Digital Database (ADD). Scale 1:250000 topographic map of Antarctica. Scientific Committee on Antarctic Research (SCAR). Since 1993, regularly upgraded and updated.

References
 Grod Island. SCAR Composite Antarctic Gazetteer.
 Bulgarian Antarctic Gazetteer. Antarctic Place-names Commission. (details in Bulgarian, basic data in English)

External links
 Grod Island. Copernix satellite image

Islands of Robert Island
Bulgaria and the Antarctic